Althepus is a genus of spiders in the family Psilodercidae. It was first described in 1898 by Tamerlan Thorell. , it contains 60 species, all from Asia.

Species
 Althepus bako Deeleman-Reinhold, 1995 — Borneo
 Althepus bamensis Li et al., 2018 — Thailand
 Althepus biltoni Deeleman-Reinhold, 1995 — Sulawesi
 Althepus changmao Li et al., 2018 — Thailand
 Althepus chengmenensis Li et al., 2018 — China
 Althepus cheni Li et al., 2018 — Myanmar
 Althepus christae Wang & Li, 2013 — China
 Althepus complicatus Deeleman-Reinhold, 1995 — Sumatra
 Althepus dekkingae Deeleman-Reinhold, 1995 — Java
 Althepus devraii Kulkarni & Dupérré, 2019 — India
 Althepus dongnaiensis Li et al., 2018 — Vietnam
 Althepus duan Li et al., 2017 — Thailand
 Althepus duoji Li et al., 2017 — Thailand
 Althepus erectus Li et al., 2014 — Laos
 Althepus flabellaris Li et al., 2014 — Thailand
 Althepus gouci Li et al., 2018 — Myanmar
 Althepus guan Li et al., 2018 — Sumatra
 Althepus hongguangi Li et al., 2018 — Sulawesi
 Althepus huoyan Li et al., 2017 — Thailand
 Althepus incognitus Brignoli, 1973 — India
 Althepus indistinctus Deeleman-Reinhold, 1995 — Borneo
 Althepus javanensis Deeleman-Reinhold, 1995 — Java
 Althepus jiandan Li et al., 2017 — Thailand
 Althepus kuan Li et al., 2017 — Thailand
 Althepus lakmueangensis Li et al., 2017 — Thailand
 Althepus languensis Li et al., 2017 — Thailand
 Althepus lehi Deeleman-Reinhold, 1985 — Borneo
 Althepus leucosternus Deeleman-Reinhold, 1995 — Thailand
 Althepus maechamensis Li et al., 2018 — Thailand
 Althepus menglaensis Li et al., 2018 — China
 Althepus minimus Deeleman-Reinhold, 1995 — Sumatra
 Althepus muangensis Li et al., 2017 — Thailand
 Althepus naphongensis Li et al., 2018 — Vietnam
 Althepus natmataungensis Li et al., 2018 — Myanmar
 Althepus noonadanae Brignoli, 1973 — Philippines
 Althepus nophaseudi Li et al., 2014 — Laos
 Althepus phadaengensis Li et al., 2018 — Thailand
 Althepus phousalao Li et al., 2018 — Laos
 Althepus pictus Thorell, 1898 — Myanmar
 Althepus pum Deeleman-Reinhold, 1995 — Thailand
 Althepus qianhuang Li et al., 2018 — Java
 Althepus qingyuani Li et al., 2018 — China
 Althepus qiqiu Li et al., 2017 — Thailand
 Althepus reduncus Li et al., 2014 — Myanmar
 Althepus sepakuensis Li et al., 2018 — Borneo
 Althepus shanhu Li et al., 2018 — Myanmar
 Althepus spiralis Li et al., 2014 — Malaysia
 Althepus stonei Deeleman-Reinhold, 1995 — Thailand
 Althepus suayaiensis Li et al., 2018 — Thailand
 Althepus suhartoi Deeleman-Reinhold, 1985 — Sumatra
 Althepus tadetuensis Li et al., 2018 — Laos
 Althepus tanhuang Li et al., 2018 — Thailand
 Althepus thanlaensis Li et al., 2018 — Thailand
 Althepus tharnlodensis Li et al., 2018 — Thailand
 Althepus tibiatus Deeleman-Reinhold, 1985 — Thailand
 Althepus tuqi Li et al., 2017 — Thailand
 Althepus viengkeoensis Li et al., 2018 — Laos
 Althepus xianxi Li et al., 2017 — Thailand
 Althepus xuae Li et al., 2018 — China
 Althepus yizhuang Li et al., 2018 — Sumatra

References

Psilodercidae
Araneomorphae genera
Spiders of Asia